

June 1, 1969 (Sunday)
Former Prime Minister Georges Pompidou and Acting President of France Alain Poher finished first and second in a field of seven candidates in the first round of the French presidential election.  Pompidou received almost 45% of the ballots cast, and Poher edged Communist Party candidate Jacques Duclos split another 44% of the votes, with Poher getting 23% to Duclos's 21%.  Because none of the candidates received a majority of the votes, a runoff election between Pompidou and Poher was set for two weeks later.
Died: 
Attilio Degrassi, 81, Italian archaeologist and specialist in epigraphy, the collection and analysis of information from inscriptions on ancient works.
Ivar Ballangrud, 65, Norwegian speed skater who won three gold medals at the 1936 Winter Olympics

June 2, 1969 (Monday)
The United States Supreme Court voted 6 to 2 in the case of Boykin v. Alabama to set aside a death sentence meted out to an African-American who had pleaded guilty to the armed robbery of five stores in Mobile, Alabama, holding that it was clear from the transcript of the case that Edward Boykin's plea had been made without any indication that he had been made aware of its consequences.  Writing for the majority, Justice William O. Douglas said "A plea of guilty is more than an admission of conduct; it is a conviction... Ignorance, incomprehension, terror, inducements, subtle or blatant threats might be a perfect cover-up of unconstitutionality.  What is at stake for an accused facing death or imprisonment demands utmost solicitude of which courts are capable, in canvassing the matter with the accused, to make sure he has a full understanding of what the plea connotes and of its consequence... So far as the record shows, the judge asked no questions of [Boykin] concerning his plea, and [Boykin] did not address the court.  Boykin had been scheduled to go to the electric chair in June 1968 despite the fact that nobody had been killed in the robberies, and the only injury had been when a girl was struck in the leg by the ricochet of a bullet.  The Court did not reach the question of whether a state could impose the death penalty for armed robbery without fatalities.

June 3, 1969 (Tuesday)
Seventy-four U.S. Navy men were killed when their destroyer, the USS Frank E. Evans, was accidentally rammed and sliced in two by the Australian aircraft carrier HMAS Melbourne. The Frank E. Evans had a crew of 273 when the collision took place during pre-dawn maneuvers at 4:12 in the morning Philippine Time (0812 Monday UTC). The Melbourne was able to lash the stern of the American destroyer to its side to keep it upright, and the 197 people on board that section of the ship survived. Three of the dead were brothers, Cary Sage, Gregory Sage and Kelly Sage of Niobrara, Nebraska. The ships had been maneuvering in the South China Sea as part of maneuvers among the navies of the SEATO, the Southeast Asia Treaty Organization. A subsequent investigation by a joint Australian and American board of inquiry found that on May 31, the Melbourne had come within  of colliding with another American ship, the USS Everett F. Larson.
The 79th and last original episode of Star Trek, "Turnabout Intruder", was telecast on NBC as the network shifted the series from its 10:00 p.m. Eastern time slot to a regular 7:30 p.m. Tuesday night location for its summer re-runs.  By then, NBC had announced that it would not renew the science fiction drama for a fourth season.  The episode had been scheduled for March 28 but had been preempted by a news report about the life of Dwight D. Eisenhower, who had died earlier that day.  With an earlier broadcast time, the reruns drew more viewers than the original shows had received, a precursor to what would happen next.  Never high in the Nielsen ratings during its years on NBC, the show would attain greater popularity in broadcast syndication, starting as early as September 15.

June 4, 1969 (Wednesday)
All 79 persons on board Mexicana Flight 704 were killed when the Boeing 727 crashed while making its approach to Monterrey on a flight from Mexico City.  Approaching the airport in a torrential rain and with low visibility, the Mexican airplane turned left rather than right when ordered to enter a holding pattern, and struck a vertical face of the Fraile del Cerro, a  peak in the Sierra Madre Oriental.
Armando Socarras Ramirez, a 22-year old refugee from Cuba, arrived in Madrid on Iberia Airlines Flight 942 from Havana, after he and a companion climbed into the wheel compartments of the Douglas DC-8 as it was taxiing for takeoff. Ground crew workers in Madrid were surprised when Socarras, nearly frozen from a seven and a half hour ride in the unpressurized wheel compartment, fell out of the right wheel well after the airliner came to a stop. Socarras told investigators that the other stowaway, 16-year old Jorge Perez Blanco, had climbed into the left side wheel well and was believed to have fallen to his death after the airline pilot noticed that the landing gear hadn't fully retracted and had lowered it a second time. Two weeks later, however, several new arrivals from Cuba reported that Perez Blanco had apparently tumbled onto the runway while the plane was taxiing for a takeoff, and that he had been taken to jail. 
Died: 
Rafael Osuna, 30, Mexican professional tennis player and winner of the 1963 U.S. Open and three Grand Slam doubles titles, in the crash of Mexicana Flight 704.
Carlos A. Madrazo, 53, Mexican politician and former Chairman of Mexico's ruling political party, the PRI, in the crash of Mexicana Flight 704.

June 5, 1969 (Thursday)
In the first authenticated case of falling space debris causing damage on Earth, the Japanese freighter ship Dai Chi Chinei was heavily damaged by wreckage from a Soviet spacecraft that had re-entered Earth's atmosphere.  Five of the crewmen on the Dai Chi Chinei were seriously injured by a chunk of debris while the freighter was traversing the Strait of Tartary between the island of Sakhalin and mainland Siberia, and the accident was then investigated and confirmed by the United Nations.  According to the Japanese crew, two Soviet Navy ships arrived at the site shortly after the freighter had been struck.
"Rivet Amber", a U.S. Air Force RC-135E reconnaissance spy plane similar to one shot by North Korea a month earlier, disappeared along with all 19 of its crew while flying an exercise over the Aleutian Islands in Alaska.  Although the plane was not shot down, it sent a distress call to Elmendorf Air Force Base as it traveled between the island of Shemya and Eielson Air Force Base, and was believed to have been monitoring Soviet radar and radio communications from a distance.  No trace of the aircraft nor its crew has ever been found.
The Tupolev Tu-144 supersonic jet became the first civilian airliner to be test flown faster than the speed of sound. 
Moscow hosted the International Meeting of Communist and Workers Parties, a gathering of the leaders and representatives of the communist parties of the world's nations.

June 6, 1969 (Friday)
The United States Court of Appeals voided the "Hershey Directive" that had been sent to American draft boards by General Lewis B. Hershey, the director of the Selective Service System.  In a letter sent on October 24, 1967, General Hershey had suggested that local draft boards reclassify the status of any anti-government protesters who had a deferment, with an upgrade to 1-A permitting immediate induction into the selective service.  The court wrote that the Hershey letter was a "declaration of war against anti-war protesters" that had no basis in the law but that was made "full-grown from the head of General Hershey without benefit of reference of any provision" of the draft law.
New York Jets quarterback Joe Namath called a press conference to announce, with tears in his eyes, that he was retiring from professional football, less than six months after being the Most Valuable Player of Super Bowl III, in the wake of a threatened suspension by pro football commissioner Pete Rozelle. Namath had been ordered to sell his one-half interest in a New York restaurant, Bachelors III, because some of the restaurant's regular customers were bookies who were taking gambling bets on the restaurant premises and others were members of organized crime.  Namath would reverse his position a few weeks later and report to the Jets' training camp in July.
Died: British Army General Miles Dempsey, 72, known for commanding the British Second Army assault on Gold, Juno and Sword Beaches on D-Day, the Allied invasion of Normandy.  General Dempsey's passing took place on the 25th anniversary of D-Day.

June 7, 1969 (Saturday)
The American Echo 2 communications satellite, the largest artificial Earth satellite of all time, re-entered the atmosphere and burned up after having been visible by most of the world's residents since its launch on January 25, 1964.  Consisting of a rigid mylar and aluminum balloon, Echo 2 was last seen at 7:36 in the morning local time (1036 UTC) from Comodoro Rivadavia in Argentina and was estimated to have burned up over Great Britain by 7:00 in the afternoon local time (1900 UTC). 
The long-awaited debut of Eric Clapton and Steve Winwood performing together in the short-lived "supergroup" Blind Faith took place in front of 100,000 people in London's Hyde Park.  Guitarist/vocalist Clapton and drummer Peter "Ginger" Baker came from the recently disbanded rock group Cream; Winwood had been playing keyboards and was lead singer for Traffic, the first supergroup.  Bassist Ric Grech from Family completed the quartet.  Blind Faith would release their only album in August, and do concerts in Europe and the United States for eleven weeks before playing their final show in Honolulu on August 24. 
The U.S. Department of Defense expanded its AUTOVON (an acronym for AUTOomatic VOice Network) to its military posts worldwide, giving priority to all defense-related phone calls over civilian phone lines.
Born: Kim Rhodes, American television actress, in Portland, Oregon
Died: Dan Bullock, 15, United States Marine and the youngest American serviceman to be killed in the Vietnam War.  Bullock, an African-American living in Brooklyn after moving from North Carolina, had been only 14 years old when he altered his birth certificate to show that he was 18 years old.  He was killed while guarding the An Hoa Combat Base in South Vietnam.

June 8, 1969 (Sunday)
Following a meeting at Midway Island between U.S. President Richard Nixon and South Vietnamese President Nguyễn Văn Thiệu, President Nixon announced that 25,000 American troops would be withdrawn from the Vietnam War by the end of September.  The first group to be removed from South Vietnam would be 900 combat infantrymen from the 9th Infantry Division of the United States Army, who would be "airlifted to the continental United States for inactivation", according to Secretary of Defense Melvin Laird.  Withdrawal would be completed between July 8 and August 28.
Twelve members of one family— two parents and 10 of their children ranging in age from six months old to 17 years old were killed in an arson fire that destroyed their home in Parkersburg, West Virginia.  The only survivors were two of the other children, aged 15 and 13, and their grandfather. Two days later, the surviving teenagers were arrested after police said that the 15-year-old girl had told them that they intentionally set the blaze following an argument with their parents.  After the teens were indicted for murder and the case scheduled for trial, the Wood County, West Virginia circuit court would rule "that an alleged confession [by the girl] and subsequent evidence turned up by the confession were obtained without her knowingly and intelligently waiving her rights" and were thus inadmissible.  On April 17, 1970, the murder charges would be dismissed because the only evidence linking the teenagers to the crime was no longer available.
Died: Robert Taylor (stage name for Spangler Brugh), 57, American film and television star; from lung cancer

June 9, 1969 (Monday)

Shortly after midnight, the government of Spain closed its border with the British Overseas Territory of Gibraltar, located on the south of the Iberian peninsula.  While Gibraltarians had been barred from Spain since May 1968, about 4,800 Spanish citizens had been allowed to work in Gibraltar (which had a resident population of about 24,500 at the time) and would no longer be allowed to work there.  On June 28, Spain halted the ferry service that brought tourists to Gibraltar from its Mediterranean Sea port of Algeciras in the Province of Cádiz.  After more than 13 years, the border closing would be partially lifted on December 15, 1982, and the "big green gate" at the Spanish town of La Línea de la Concepción would be opened for thousands of Spanish citizens and Gibraltarians were allowed to walk through.  The frontier gate across the road crossing would remain closed for more than 15 years until 30 seconds past midnight, local time, on February 5, 1985.
For the first time in American history, the Federal Reserve Board of Governors approved an increase of a full percentage point in the U.S. prime rate — the minimum interest rate for an American bank to loan money. Although previous increases had been for one-half or one-quarter of a point, the rate was increased from 7½% to 8½%, the highest up to that time.  The rate would be lowered to 8% on March 25, 1970, and continue to drop during the Nixon administration, reaching a low of 4½ on February 16, 1972, then begin rising, reaching 12% by the time of Nixon's resignation in 1974, before dropping again during the presidency of Gerald Ford; during the administration of Jimmy Carter, the rate would rise from 6¼% to a record high of 21½% on December 19, 1980.  The "prime rate" is that which is reserved for borrowers with the highest credit, with higher interest rates than prime permitted for borrowers considered to be at risk for default.
President Nixon's nomination of Warren E. Burger for Chief Justice of the United States was confirmed by the Democrat-dominated United States Senate, 74 to 3, with only Stephen M. Young of Ohio, Gaylord Nelson of Wisconsin, and Eugene J. McCarthy (from Burger's home state of Minnesota), all Democrats, voting no.

June 10, 1969 (Tuesday)

Pope Paul VI became the first Pontiff of the Roman Catholic Church to visit Switzerland, landing in Geneva for 12 hours to visit the headquarters of the World Council of Churches in the traditional "intellectual center of Protestant thought". The Pope was greeted by the Reverend Eugene Carson Blake, an American Presbyterian minister and General Secretary of the World Council, where the two discussed issues relating to future Christian unity.  The Council itself was composed of representatives of 234 different denominations of Protestant and Orthodox organizations (with 234 different denominations), and event marked the highest level meeting of the leaders of Catholic and non-Catholic Christians.  The Pope also delivered a speech at the annual world meeting of the International Labour Organization, which was celebrating its 50th anniversary, and which had 1,700 delegates from 121 nations.

Further work on the Manned Orbiting Laboratory (MOL), the U.S. Air Force's planned military space station, was halted on orders of American President Richard Nixon as part of a cut of the defense budget.  Ever since the first announcement in 1963 of the planned MOL (which would have featured two USAF astronauts working for 30 days at a time "to inspect and destroy, if necessary, hostile satellites"), 1.3 billion dollars had been spent on the project and another $1.5 billion was projected to be paid over until completion in 1974, which was already 2½ years behind schedule and was 50% more expensive than originally projected.  The end of the American program, in effect, brought an end to the need of the MOL's counterpart in the Soviet Union, the Almaz ("Diamond") space station (which would be modified for launch as the civilian Salyut 2 station).  By 1969, however, the reconnaissance features of both the MOL and Almaz had been made obsolete by unmanned spy satellites.
A column of Soviet troops and tanks crossed the border from the Kazakh SSR (now the nation of Kazakhstan) into the Xinjiang autonomous region of the People's Republic of China, moving through Yumin County where shots were exchanged between Chinese borders guards and the invaders.  The Soviets denied invading China, and accused the Chinese of provoking an attack by sending a group of soldiers roughly  into Soviet territory.  Although the Soviets and Chinese had fought in March on a disputed island in the Ussuri River, the border crossings were the first penetrations over the land boundary between the two nuclear superpowers.
The Viet Cong organization, officially called the National Liberation Front of South Vietnam (NLF), announced that it had selected leaders for its "Provisional Revolutionary Government of the Republic of South Vietnam" (PRG), a "government in exile" to assume leadership if the Viet Cong and North Vietnam were successful in conquering South Vietnam. Former South Vietnamese lawyer and NLF president Nguyễn Hữu Thọ was named as chairman of the advisory council to the PRG, and Huỳnh Tấn Phát was named the PRG Council President. After the fall of Saigon to Communist forces on April 30, 1975, the two men would administer South Vietnam on behalf of North Vietnam until the official reunification of the two nations as the Socialist Republic of Vietnam on July 2, 1976.

June 11, 1969 (Wednesday)
Mankind's first trip by sled across the Arctic Ocean came to a successful conclusion as a pair of helicopters picked up the four members of the British Trans-Arctic Expedition — Wally Herbert, Roy Koerner, Allan Gill, and Kenneth Hedges — from the Norwegian island of Vesle Tavleøya and transported them to the Royal Navy patrol ship HMS Endurance; Herbert would tell reporters later that "We envisaged the grand finale with the four dog teams and sledges pulling close to the ship or, even better, the party landing on West Spitsbergen island and sledging down the fjord and over the glaciers to meet the Endurance," rather than having to end the journey with a helicopter flight.
Born: Peter Dinklage, American stage, film and television actor known for Game of Thrones; in Morristown, New Jersey
Died: John L. Lewis, 80, American labor leader who built the United Mine Workers of America into one of the most powerful labor unions in America during his 40 years as UMWA President

June 12, 1969 (Thursday)

For the first time in history, part of Niagara Falls was "turned off", as a cofferdam was put in place behind the American Falls portion of the U.S. and Canadian waterfall. Horseshoe Falls and the Bridal Veil Falls continued to flow without interruption, but the American Falls were allowed to run dry.  For the next five months and 13 days, repairs were made to prevent erosion of the riverbed and tourists were allowed to walk across part of the area where the river had run its course.  The dam would be removed on November 25 and all three portions of Niagara Falls have flowed continuously since then.
Canada's Criminal Law Amendment Act, 1968–69, decriminalizing abortion and homosexual relationships, was approved by voice vote in the Senate of Canada following its third reading, after having passed Commons on May 14.  The legislation (which still required royal assent before taking effect) legalized abortion in Canada on condition that a pregnancy could be terminated if a consensus of three physicians at a licensed hospital determined that the mother's health, not otherwise defined, was in danger.  The bill also allowed gay relations between two consenting adults (age 21 or older) in private dwellings.
NASA announced that Apollo 11 was cleared for launch on July 16 for the first manned landing on the Moon.  U.S. Air Force Lieutenant General Samuel C. Phillips, the director of the Apollo program gave the go-ahead after an 80-minute telephone conference between NASA officials at Houston, Cape Kennedy, Huntsville and Washington.  The alternative would have been to postpone the launch until August.  NASA released a timetable four days later, with the original date of Neil Armstrong's first steps on the Moon being set for Monday, July 21, at 2:22 in the morning Eastern Time (0722 UTC)
Nine passengers on an overloaded oyster boat, the Red Bank, died when the craft capsized in Ireland's Galway Bay near New Quay in County Clare.  The Red Bank, launched earlier in the day, was giving local residents free trips around the bay when the disaster occurred.
Died: 
Moise Tshombe, 49, former Congolese Prime Minister who later led a secession of the Katanga province; of a heart attack while imprisoned in Algeria.
Bart Lytton, 56, American financier who lost most of his fortune in the real estate market.

June 30, 1969 (Monday)
Nigeria blocked most humanitarian aid to the starving residents of the breakaway Republic of Biafra by telling the International Committee of the Red Cross and 19 other relief agencies that they would no longer be permitted to send relief planes to the starving Biafran population.
Born: Sanath Jayasuriya, Sri Lankan cricket star, in Matara
Died: Augusto Vandor, Argentine labor leader and President of the Argentina's largest labor union, the Unión Obrera Metalúrgica (Metal Workers Union), was shot to death in his office.  Earlier, he had come under criticism from other labor leaders within the CGT (Confederación General del Trabajo or General Labor Confederation) for refusing to have the steel workers participate in a nationwide strike.

References

1969
1969-06
1969-06